Romeo and Juliet is a 1968 period-drama film based on the play of the same name by William Shakespeare. Directed and co-written by Franco Zeffirelli, the film stars Leonard Whiting as Romeo and Olivia Hussey as Juliet. Laurence Olivier spoke the film's prologue and epilogue and dubs the voice of Antonio Pierfederici, who played Lord Montague but was not credited on-screen. The film also stars Milo O'Shea, Michael York, John McEnery, Bruce Robinson, and Robert Stephens.

The most financially successful film adaptation of a Shakespeare play at the time of its release, it was popular among teenagers partly because it was the first film to use actors who were close to the age of the characters from the original play. Several critics also welcomed the film enthusiastically. It won Academy Awards for Best Cinematography (Pasqualino De Santis) and Best Costume Design (Danilo Donati); it was also nominated for Best Director and Best Picture, making it the last Shakespearean film to date to be nominated for the latter category. Whiting and Hussey both won Golden Globe Awards for Most Promising Newcomers.

Plot
One summer morning in Verona, a longstanding feud between the Montague and the Capulet clans breaks out in a street brawl. The brawl is broken up by the Prince, who warns both families that any future violence between them will result in harsh consequences.  That night, two teenagers of the two families—Romeo and Juliet—meet at a Capulet masked ball and fall in love. Later, Romeo stumbles into the secluded garden under Juliet's bedroom balcony and the two exchange impassioned pledges.  They are secretly married the next day by Romeo's confessor and father figure, Friar Laurence, with the assistance of Juliet's nurse.

That afternoon, Juliet's cousin Tybalt, furious that Romeo had attended his family's ball, insults him and challenges him to a brawl.  Romeo now regards Tybalt as family and he refuses to fight him, which leads Romeo's best friend, Mercutio, to fight Tybalt instead. Despite Romeo's efforts to stop the fight, Tybalt mortally wounds Mercutio, who curses both the Montague and Capulet houses before dying.  Enraged over his friend's death, Romeo retaliates by fighting Tybalt and killing him.  Romeo is subsequently punished by the Prince with banishment from Verona, with the threat of death if he ever returns. Romeo then secretly spends his wedding night with Juliet, the couple consummate their marriage, ans Romeo flees.

Juliet's parents, unaware of their daughter's secret marriage, have arranged for Juliet to marry wealthy Count Paris. Juliet pleads with her parents to postpone the marriage, but they refuse and threaten to disown her. Juliet seeks out Friar Laurence for help, hoping to escape her arranged marriage to Paris and remain faithful to Romeo. At Friar Laurence's behest, she reconciles with her parents and agrees to their wishes. On the night before the wedding, Juliet consumes a potion prepared by Friar Laurence intended to make her appear dead for 42 hours.  Friar Laurence plans to inform Romeo of the hoax so that Romeo can meet Juliet after her burial and escape with her when she recovers from her swoon, so he sends Friar John to give Romeo a letter describing the plan.

However, when Balthasar, Romeo's servant, sees Juliet being buried under the impression that she is dead, he goes to tell Romeo and reaches him before Friar John. In despair, Romeo goes to Juliet's tomb and kills himself by drinking poison.  Soon afterwards, Friar Laurence arrives as Juliet awakens. Despite his attempts to persuade her to flee from the crypt, Juliet refuses to leave Romeo, and once the Friar flees, she kills herself by plunging his dagger into her chest. Later, the two families, having ended their feud, attend their joint funeral and are condemned by the Prince.

Cast

The House of Montague
 Antonio Pierfederici as Lord Montague
 Esmeralda Ruspoli as Lady Montague
 Leonard Whiting as Romeo
 Bruce Robinson as Benvolio
 Keith Skinner as Balthasar
 Roberto Antonelli as Abram

The House of Capulet
 Paul Hardwick as Lord Capulet
 Natasha Parry as Lady Capulet
 Olivia Hussey as Juliet
 Michael York as Tybalt
 Dyson Lovell as Sampson
 Richard Warwick as Gregory
 Pat Heywood as The Nurse
 Roy Holder as Peter

Others
 John McEnery as Mercutio
 Milo O'Shea as Friar Laurence
 Robert Stephens as The Prince of Verona
 Roberto Bisacco as Paris
 Paola Tedesco as Rosaline (uncredited)
 Bruno Filippini as Leonardo, the singer (uncredited)
 Laurence Olivier as the chorus and voice of Lord Montague (uncredited)

Production

Casting 
Paul McCartney has said he was considered by Franco Zeffirelli for the role of Romeo. Although Zeffirelli does not mention it in his autobiography, McCartney provided details on this account (including meeting with Olivia Hussey and exchanging telegrams with her) in his co-written autobiography. In April 2020, McCartney referred to his discussions with Zeffirelli on The Howard Stern Show.

Zeffirelli engaged in a worldwide search for unknown teenage actors to play the parts of the two lovers. Anjelica Huston was in the running for Juliet, but her father, the director John Huston, withdrew her from consideration when he decided to cast her in his film A Walk with Love and Death. Leonard Whiting was 16 and Hussey was 15 during casting, but were 17 and 16 when filming began in the summer of 1967. Zeffirelli adapted the play in such a way as to play to their strengths and hide their weaknesses: for instance, long speeches were trimmed, and he emphasized reaction shots.

Laurence Olivier's involvement in the production was by happenstance. He was in Rome to film The Shoes of the Fisherman and visited the studio where Romeo and Juliet was being shot. He asked Zeffirelli if there was anything he could do, and was given the Prologue to read, then ended up dubbing the voice of Lord Montague as well as other assorted minor roles.

Filming
After cast readings in late May, rehearsals and filming began at the end of June of 1967 in Tuscania, Italy, then moved to Pienza, Gubbio, and Artena, before completing at Cinecittà movie studios in Rome.  The famous Romeo and Juliet balcony scene was filmed in Artena in September of 1967.

The film is set in 14th century Renaissance Italy.
 The balcony scene: at the Palazzo Borghese, built by Cardinal Scipione Borghese in the 16th century, in Artena, 40 km southeast of Rome.
 The interior church scenes: at the Romanesque church of San Pietro, Tuscania in the town of Tuscania, 90 km northwest of Rome.
 The tomb scene: also in Tuscania.
 The palace of the Capulets' scenes: at Palazzo Piccolomini, built from 1459 to 1462 by Pope Pius II, in the city of Pienza in the Siena province.
 The duelling scenes with swords were filmed in the old Umbrian town of Gubbio.
 The film also has some scenes filmed in Montagnana.
 The street scenes: also in Pienza and on the Cinecittà Studios backlot, Rome.

Editing 
During post-production, several scenes were trimmed or cut. Act 5, Scene 3, in which Romeo fights and eventually kills Paris outside Juliet's crypt, was filmed but deleted from the final print. According to Leonard Whiting and Roberto Bisacco, Zeffirelli cut the scene because he felt it unnecessarily made Romeo less sympathetic. Another scene, where Romeo and Benvolio learn about the Capulet ball by intercepting an invitation, was filmed but cut; however, promotional stills still survive.

Because the film was shot MOS (without sound), all dialogue and Foley effects had to be looped during editing. A separate dub was created for the Italian release, with Giancarlo Giannini dubbing Whiting and Anna Maria Guarnieri dubbing Hussey, and Vittorio Gassman as narrator.

The final budgeted cost for the film was US$850,000.

Release and reception 
On March 4, 1968, Romeo and Juliet premiered during the Royal Film Performance, and was widely released in the United Kingdom the next day. It was released on 8 October 1968 in the United States and on 19 October in Italy. The film earned $14.5 million in North American box-office rentals during 1969 (equivalent to $ million in ). It was re-released in 1973 and earned US$1.7 million in rentals (equivalent to $ million in ).

Rotten Tomatoes gives the film a "Fresh" score of 95% based on 41 reviews, with an average rating of 8/10, accompanied by a positive consensus: "The solid leads and arresting visuals make a case for Zeffirelli's Romeo and Juliet as the definitive cinematic adaptation of the play."

Roger Ebert of the Chicago Sun-Times wrote: "I believe Franco Zeffirelli's Romeo and Juliet is the most exciting film of Shakespeare ever made."

Awards and nominations

Soundtrack

Two releases of the score of the film, composed by Nino Rota, have been made.

The film's "Love Theme from Romeo and Juliet" was widely disseminated, notably in "Our Tune", a segment of Simon Bates's radio show. In addition, various versions of the theme have been recorded and released, including a highly successful one by Henry Mancini, whose instrumental rendition was a success in the United States during June 1969.

There are two different sets of English lyrics to the song.
 The film's version is called "What Is a Youth?", featuring lyrics by Eugene Walter, and sung by Glen Weston. This version has been released on the complete score/soundtrack release.
 An alternate version, called "A Time for Us", features lyrics by Larry Kusik and Eddie Snyder. This version has been recorded by Johnny Mathis, Andy Williams and Shirley Bassey for her 1968 album This Is My Life. Josh Groban performed "Un Giorno Per Noi", an Italian version of "A Time for Us". Jonathan Antoine, a classically trained tenor from Great Britain, performed "Un Giorno Per Noi" as one of the tracks on his album "Believe", released in August 2016.

A third version called "Ai Giochi Addio", featuring lyrics by Elsa Morante and sung in the Italian version by Bruno Filippini, who plays the minstrel in the film, has been performed by opera singers such as Luciano Pavarotti and Natasha Marsh.

Lawsuit
Despite her previous defense of the film's nudity, asserting that it was done "tastefully" and was "needed for the film", Hussey, along with Whiting, filed a lawsuit on 3 January 2023 in the Los Angeles County Superior Court against Paramount Pictures for US$500 million, alleging sexual abuse, sexual harassment and fraud, and for allowing Zeffirelli to film them in the nude without their knowledge. The suit alleges that the actors feel this caused them to suffer through emotional damage and mental anguish for decades after the film's success, and left them with careers that failed to reflect that success. Zeffirelli's son responded to the lawsuit critically, calling it "embarrassing" that Hussey and Whiting filed the suit "55 years after filming" and that they owe their entire careers to the success of the film.

In popular culture

 Director/screenwriter Bruce Robinson claims Zeffirelli made unwanted sexual advances during the film's production. Robinson depicted this incident in dialogue from his film Withnail & I, where the title character (played by Richard E. Grant) reads from a newspaper "'Boy Lands Plum Role for Top Italian Director'" and then remarks "Course he does! Probably on a tenner a day, and I know what for! 2 pound 10/- a tit and a fiver for his arse!"

References 

Notes

Further reading
 "Virtuoso in Verona" — 1968 review in Time

External links
 , featuring magazine articles and film reviews (archived)
 
 
 
 
 

1968 films
1968 romantic drama films
1960s British films
1960s English-language films
1960s historical drama films
1960s historical romance films
1960s Italian films
British historical drama films
British historical romance films
British romantic drama films
English-language Italian films
Films based on Romeo and Juliet
Films directed by Franco Zeffirelli
Films produced by Anthony Havelock-Allan
Films scored by Nino Rota
Films set in the 15th century
Films set in Italy
Films shot at Cinecittà Studios
Films shot at Pinewood Studios
Films shot in Rome
Films shot in Tuscany
Films that won the Best Costume Design Academy Award
Films whose cinematographer won the Best Cinematography Academy Award
Italian historical drama films
Italian historical romance films
Italian romantic drama films
Paramount Pictures films